Joshua K. Goodhue (born 13 June 1995) is a New Zealand rugby union player.

Early career
Goodhue was raised on a farm in the Northland Region of New Zealand along with older brother Cameron and twin brother Jack, who would both also go on to become professional rugby union players. He attended Mount Albert Grammar School in Auckland where he captained their top side to 17 victories in 20 games during the 2013 season.

After finishing school, he took a short break to visit brother Cameron who was playing for Worcester Warriors in England at the time. He played some rugby in England before returning to his homeland to turn out for Kawakawa in the local Northland club competition. During this time, he also captained his province at Under 19 level. He later joined twin brother, Jack, in studying at Lincoln University.

Senior career
Goodhue earned his first provincial cap for Northland in 2015 and appeared 7 times in total during what was a season to forget for the men from the far north as they finished bottom of the ITM Cup Championship standings with no wins in 10 games. He scored 3 tries in 6 games the following year in which the Taniwha improved, even if their results didn't, winning just 1 of 10 regular season games. In Round 4 of the 2021 Bunnings NPC Goodhue played his 50th game for the Taniwha against  in Palmerston North.

Super Rugby
Impressive displays in tough circumstances for Northland saw Goodhue handed a Super Rugby contract by the Auckland based Blues ahead of the 2017 Super Rugby season. He made his debut on 15 April 2017, coming off the bench against the Hurricanes.

International

Goodhue represented New Zealand at schoolboy level and was a member of the New Zealand Under-20 side which won the 2015 World Rugby Under 20 Championship in Italy.

Career Honours

New Zealand Under 20

World Rugby Under 20 Championship - 2015

Blues

Super Rugby Trans-Tasman

References

1995 births
Living people
New Zealand rugby union players
Rugby union locks
Northland rugby union players
People from Kawakawa, New Zealand
People educated at Mount Albert Grammar School
Blues (Super Rugby) players
Rugby union players from the Northland Region
Black Rams Tokyo players